On January 31, 1957, a Douglas DC-7B operated by Douglas Aircraft Company was involved in a mid-air collision with a United States Air Force Northrop F-89 Scorpion and crashed into the schoolyard of Pacoima Junior High School located in Pacoima, a suburban area in the San Fernando Valley of Los Angeles, California.

Accident
The DC-7B, which was earmarked for delivery to Continental Airlines, took off from the Santa Monica Airport at 10:15 a.m. on its first functional test flight, with a crew of four Douglas personnel aboard. Meanwhile, in Palmdale to the north, a pair of two-seater F-89J fighter jets took off at 10:50 a.m. on test flights, one that involved a check of their on-board radar equipment. Investigators were later able to determine that the two aircraft most likely converged at a point over an area northeast of the Hansen Dam spillway.

Following the collision, Curtiss Adams, the radarman aboard the eastbound twin-engine F-89J Scorpion, was able to bail out of the stricken fighter jet and, despite incurring severe burns, parachuted to a landing on a garage roof in Burbank, breaking his leg when he fell to the ground. The fighter jet's pilot, Roland E. Owen, died when the aircraft plummeted in flames into La Tuna Canyon in the Verdugo Mountains.

The DC-7B, with a portion of its left wing shorn off, remained airborne for a few minutes.  It rolled to the left and began an uncontrollable, spiraling, high-velocity dive earthward. In doing so, it began raining debris onto the Pacoima neighborhoods below as the aircraft began to break apart. Seconds later, part of the hurtling wreckage slammed onto the grounds of the Pacoima Congregational Church, killing all four Douglas crew members aboard while the major portions fell onto the adjacent playground of Pacoima Junior High School. On the school playground, where 220 boys were ending their outdoor athletic activities, the wreckage broke upon impact into numerous pieces, and intense fires began due to the aircraft's fuel and oil. Distinct craters were made in the playground by each of the four engines and the main center fuselage section. Two students were struck and killed by this wreckage and debris. A third gravely injured student died two days later in a local hospital. An estimated 75 more students on the school playground suffered critical and minor injuries. 

The collision was blamed on pilot error and the failure of both aircraft crews to exercise proper "see and avoid" procedures regarding other aircraft while operating under visual flight rules (VFR). The crash also prompted the Civil Aeronautics Board (CAB) to set restrictions on all aircraft test flights, both military and civilian, requiring that they be made over open water or specifically approved sparsely populated areas.

Media representation

The event is depicted in the film La Bamba, the 1987 biopic of rock 'n' roll figure Ritchie Valens, who was a 15-year-old student at Pacoima Junior High School at the time of the disaster.

Valens was not at school that day because he was attending the funeral of his grandfather. Recurring nightmares of the disaster led to Valens' fear of flying, which he overcame after he launched his music career. Valens was killed in a plane crash two years later, along with fellow rock 'n' rollers Buddy Holly and The Big Bopper as well as pilot Roger Peterson, when their chartered Beechcraft Bonanza crashed near Mason City, Iowa, late at night of February 3, 1959. However, in the nightmare sequences of the film, the first collision was portrayed by two general aviation aircraft (one of which was the Beechcraft Bonanza in which Valens actually died), as opposed to the aircraft in the actual disaster.

The 1957 crash was discussed on the May 19, 1957, episode of The CBS Radio Workshop (entitled "Heaven Is In the Sky"). The program described when and how both planes took off from their respective airfields, and included discussion of how the Pacoima Junior High School was having the 7th-grade students outside for exercise. It also included interviews with people who were witnesses and/or affected by the crash.

References

External links

 Final accident report, Civil Aeronautics Board DOCKET # SA-323, FILE #2-0020, DATE ADOPTED November 22, 1957, p. 5. PDF
 ASN Aircraft accident Douglas DC-7B N8210H Sunland, CA – Aviation Safety Network
 We Remember We Heal – Joan Gushin website
 Test Planes Collide Over School, 7 Die – Joan Gushin website
 List of injuries, Pacoima JHS – Joan Gushin website
 CBS Radio Workshop, Episode "Heaven Is In the Sky"

Aviation accidents and incidents in California
1957 in military history
1957 in Los Angeles
20th-century history of the United States Air Force
Mid-air collisions
Accidents and incidents involving United States Air Force aircraft
Mid-air collisions involving airliners
Mid-air collisions involving military aircraft
Aviation accidents and incidents in the United States in 1957
Disasters in Los Angeles
History of the San Fernando Valley
Pacoima, Los Angeles
Accidents and incidents involving the Douglas DC-7
January 1957 events in the United States